Phrynocephalus strauchi, Strauch's toad agama, is a species of agamid lizard found in Tajikistan, Kyrgyzstan, and Uzbekistan.

References

strauchi
Reptiles described in 1899
Taxa named by Alexander Nikolsky